Menemerus patellaris is a species of jumping spider in the genus Menemerus that lives in Yemen. The male was first described in 2007.

References

Salticidae
Spiders described in 2007
Spiders of the Arabian Peninsula